This is a list of mobile network operators in Kenya:

 Safaricom
 Airtel Kenya 
 Telkom Kenya 
Jamii Telecommunications Limited

Market share
As of October 2018, the market share among Kenyan mobile telephone operators was as depicted in the table below.

Note:Totals are slightly off due to rounding.

See also
 Communications Authority of Kenya
 Economy of Kenya

References

External links
Website of Communications Authority of Kenya
MTN takes a firm grip on Kenya online business space
Telcos market shift as Airtel gains voice traffic, Safaricom drops As of 12 April 2018.
 Safaricom’s dominance under threat from rivals As of 11 September 2018.

Nairobi
 
Kenya communications-related lists
Lists of companies of Kenya